Clostridium uliginosum is a mesophilic bacterium oxidizing acetate in syntrophic association with a hydrogenotrophic methanogenic bacterium. It is a spore-forming, gram-positive, rod-shaped organism, with type strain BST. Its genome has been sequenced.

References

Further reading

External links
 
 LPSN
 Type strain of Clostridium uliginosum at BacDive -  the Bacterial Diversity Metadatabase

Gram-positive bacteria
Bacteria described in 2001
uliginosum